Carretta is an Italian surname. Notable people with the surname include:

Mirko Carretta (born 1990), Italian footballer
Simone Carretta, 16th-century Italian painter
Raffaele "Alf" Carretta (died 2010, aged 93), former lead singer of the English band The Zimmers
Valentina Carretta (born 1989), Italian cyclist

Italian-language surnames
it:Carretta